"Dear Dad...Again" is the eighteenth episode of the first season of the American television series M*A*S*H. It originally aired on February 4, 1973.

Plot
Hawkeye writes to his father again about several crazy events that take place at the 4077th, including his bet with Trapper John that he could walk into the mess tent naked and nobody would notice (he loses), the arrival of Captain Adam Casey (portrayed by Alex Henteloff), a Demara-esque fraud masquerading as a doctor, Frank becoming drunk, and Margaret's attempt to sing "My Blue Heaven" at the camp "No-Talent Show".

Hawkeye's line, "I have always relied upon the kindness of strangers" (at minute 6:49), is a reference to Tennessee Williams' play A Streetcar Named Desire, with the line spoken by the character Blanche DuBois.

Hawkeye asks his father to "kiss sis, and Mom" in his letter to him. This is contradicted in later episodes which reveal Hawkeye as an only child with his mother deceased. He also mentions in "The Moose" that he always wanted a sister.

References

External links

M*A*S*H (season 1) episodes
1973 American television episodes
Television episodes directed by Jackie Cooper